Thomas Braddock (1887 – 9 December 1976) was a British politician. He was Labour Member of Parliament (MP) for Mitcham from 1945 to 1950, when he was defeated by the Conservative Robert Carr.

Before the war he had contested the very-Conservative Wimbledon seat in 1931 and 1935, being heavily beaten.

He subsequently stood, without success, for the Kingston-upon-Thames constituency in the 1959 and 1964 general elections, on both occasions failing to unseat the Conservative incumbent, John Boyd-Carpenter, and one final time in Wimbledon in 1966.

References

External links 
 

1887 births
1976 deaths
UK MPs 1945–1950
Labour Party (UK) MPs for English constituencies
Members of London County Council